The Wagner Group, also known as PMC Wagner, a Russian paramilitary organization also described as a private military company (PMC), a network of mercenaries, and a de facto unit of the Russian Ministry of Defence (MoD) or Russia's military intelligence agency, the GRU, has conducted operations in the Central African Republic since late 2018.

Military and militia activities 
In mid-January 2018, it was reported that Wagner may deploy a contingent of its PMCs to the Central African Republic (CAR), as Russia successfully lobbied the UN Security Council to allow it to ship weapons and ammunition to the country, despite an active arms embargo in place since 2013 under Security Council Resolution 2127. Reuters reported that France had offered to transport arms seized in Somalia to the former French colony, but was muscled out of the country by Russia. In late March, Russia's Ministry of Foreign Affairs stated five Russian soldiers and 170 "civilian instructors" had been sent to the CAR to train its servicemen. According to CAR's president, Faustin-Archange Touadéra, the training provided would strengthen the effectiveness of the CAR's armed forces in combating "plunderers". Later, the instructors were indeed

confirmed to be Wagner PMCs who were sent to the CAR to protect lucrative mines, support the CAR government and provide close protection for Touadéra.

The role of the PMCs was also to fill a security vacuum left by France after it withdrew its military forces from the country in October 2016. The country had been in the midst of a civil war since 2012, which left three-quarters of it under rebel control. The PMCs' camp was set up on 24 March 2018, about 60 kilometers from the capital Bangui at the Berengo estate that was used by CAR's former ruler Jean-Bédel Bokassa. This deployment brought the number of PMCs in Sudan and the CAR to about 370. In April, locals blocked a Russian-registered Cessna from taking off in rebel-held Kaga-Bandoro, which is located near diamond deposits. According to the CAR government, the plane was carrying Russian military advisers who had been there for peace negotiations with the rebels and witnesses stated three or four Russian soldiers from the aircraft visited the compounds of Muslim rebel leaders. This raised suspicions by CIT and the Transparency International INGO that Wagner PMCs were also guarding diamond mines in rebel territory. Several years later, a report to the UN Security Council regarding human rights violations in the CAR noted that the Russian PMCs established themselves in the country's major mining centers.

In late May 2018, the Neue Zürcher Zeitung newspaper reported the number of Russian PMCs in the CAR was 1,400. Jamestown Foundation fellow Sukhankin told Polygraph.info that the Wagner Group was in charge of military operations in the country, while another Russian private military company called Patriot was in charge of protecting VIPs. 10 Russian military instructors were stationed in the lawless town of Bangassou, on the border with the Democratic Republic of the Congo, while another unit was in the key town of Sibut, near the rebel-held territory. In early July 2018, the Wagner Group's Col. Konstantin Pikalov arrived in the CAR and was stationed there during that summer. He would once again return to the CAR following the elections in Madagascar later that year, where he also took part as a security consultant for different candidates. According to Bellingcat's Christo Grozev, during his time in the CAR, Pikalov was "a kind of intermediary" between Yevgeny Prigozhin's private companies, the Russian Ministry of Defense and the Kremlin.

In August 2018, Russia signed a military cooperation agreement with the CAR, while it also helped broker, along with Sudan, a tentative agreement among armed groups in the country. Three months later, Al Jazeera was given unprecedented access to Russian military in

structors in the CAR. While the Al Jazeera crew was filming the Russian-facilitated training for CAR troops, Valery Zakharov, the Russian special advisor to the President of the CAR, stated that the Wagner Group amounts to no more than an "urban legend" and that training in the country was being done by Russian reservists.

In December 2018, the Ukrainian SBU reported that the umbrella structure of Wagner in the CAR is a commercial firm affiliated with Yevgeny Prigozhin – M-Finance LLC Security Service from St. Petersburg, whose main areas of activity are mining of precious stones and private security services. According to the SBU, some of the PMCs were transported to Africa directly on Prigozhin's private aircraft. The SBU reported that they identified 37 Russian citizens who were engaged in the CAR by Russian military intelligence on a rotational basis as members of M-Finance LLC Security Service, whose head was reported to be Valery Zakharov from St. Petersburg. Zakharov was said to be a Wagner PMC himself, whose personal Wagner number was M-5658. Zakharov also acted as a Russian diplomat and security advisor to the CAR's president. However, according to Bellingcat's Grozev, Konstantin Pikalov was the one who was ultimately giving instructions to Zakharov.

Overall, according to information obtained by the Ukrainian SBU, 1,012 Wagner PMCs were airlifted on two Tupolev Tu-154 airliners between August and December 2018, to Sudan, the CAR and other African countries.

Five days before the 2020–21 Central African general election, rebels attacked and captured the CAR's fourth-largest city, Bambari. In response, the government requested assistance from Rwanda and Russia as per bilateral agreements. Rwanda bolstered its troops serving in the UN peacekeeping mission in the CAR, while Russia sent an additional 300 military instructors to the country. Concurrently, Russian and Rwandan "mercenaries" were reportedly deployed along with government troops at the village of Boyali, 130 kilometers northwest of the capital Bangui. The following day, UN and government forces recaptured Bambari. One month later, on 25 January 2021, CAR forces, backed by Russian PMCs and Rwandan troops, attacked Boyali, killing 44 rebels who were plotting an assault on the capital. Subsequently, CAR forces, supported by the Russian contractors and Rwandan troops, captured a number of strategic towns throughout February 2021, including Bossembele, Bouar, Beloko and Bossangoa. As the rebels were being pushed back, Valery Zakharov urged them to hand over their leaders to the CAR's security forces. During the fighting, the rebel Coalition of Patriots for Change (CPC) claimed its fighters killed several Wagner PMCs and captured one when they destroyed their truck near Bambari on 10 February. At the end of February, a Gazelle helicopter, reportedly belonging to the Wagner Group, crashed due to technical problems while on a mission to retrieve PMCs who were wounded while engaging rebels that ambushed a CAR military convoy. The helicopter crew survived the crash.

Government advances, with the support of Russian and Rwandan forces, continued during March, April and May 2021. This included the capture of the strategic towns of Bria and Kaga-Bandoro and the Bakouma sub-prefecture. Some towns were also seized solely by the Russian PMCs, including Nzacko. In at least one instance, the contractors reportedly included Syrians. Mid-May, the Russians captured a village about 40 kilometers from Bambari during fighting that left 20 people dead. In addition, at the end of the month, Russian and Syrian PMCs of the Wagner Group attacked a rebel checkpoint at the entrance of a village 28 kilometers from Bria, killing three CPC fighters. Towards the end of July, the CAR military was leaving the frontline against the CPC to the PMCs. The plan was for government troops to occupy the captured positions after they had been secured by the contractors.

At the end of March 2021, the Office of the United Nations High Commissioner for Human Rights (OHCHR) stated it received reports of mass executions, arbitrary detentions, torture, forced displacement of civilians, and attacks on humanitarian workers attributable to private military forces allied with the CAR military, including the Wagner Group, as well as to UN peacekeepers in some instances. In one incident, it was reported that a civilian vehicle was fired upon from a checkpoint outside Grimari, reportedly controlled by the Russian PMCs and CAR soldiers, killing four people, including an aid worker. The civilians were fleeing Bambari. Local residents and rights groups also stated that in Boda, west of Bangui, the PMCs occupied two schools since February, blocking around 2,000 children from attending class. Still, overall, more than 85 percent of the nearly 200 rights violations documented that took place between October and December 2020, were attributed to rebel groups, including the CPC. At the end of April, the CAR government received a report by the United Nations, detailing abuses committed by CAR and allied Russian forces between December 2020 and April 2021. The government described the information as "denunciations", but promised to investigate them. The CAR Ministry of Justice issued instructions to set up a "special commission of inquiry" which would bring in the country's three prosecutorial services.

In early May 2021, the CAR government notified the UN Security Council it was requesting 600 new Russian military instructors. According to Russia, the instructors would be unarmed.

At the end of May 2021, Central African Republic government and Russian paramilitary forces, pursued CAR rebels across the border with Chad. The incident left six Chadian soldiers dead. According to the Chadian government, the CAR military pursued rebels over the border into Chad and attacked a Chadian military border post, killing the soldiers. According to Chad, five of the soldiers were killed after being abducted and taken over the border into the CAR. The CAR government denied this and stated the rebels who they were pursuing were responsible. Some Chadian army sources named the Wagner Group as the Russian paramilitary force fighting alongside CAR forces. According to The New York Times, in the CAR the word "Wagner" is colloquially used to refer to Russian involvement in the country.

At the end of June 2021, The New York Times obtained a report given to the UN Security Council which detailed that the Russian PMCs, under the guise of unarmed military advisers, led government forces during the January–February counter-offensive. According to the report, the PMCs, along with their allied forces, committed violations that "included cases of excessive force, indiscriminate killings, occupation of schools and looting on a large scale, including of humanitarian organizations". The report was said to be based on photographic evidence and confidential testimonies by witnesses and local officials. The report also found that the rebels conducted forcible recruitment of child soldiers, attacks against peacekeepers, looting of aid groups and sexual assaults on women. At the end of October, United Nations experts urged the CAR government to cut ties with private military and security personnel, including the Wagner Group, accusing them of committing human rights abuses.

By mid-November 2021, according to a report by the European External Action Service, most of the Central African Armed Forces deployed units were operating under direct command or supervision by Wagner Group PMCs, who took command of at least one EU-trained battalion (Bataillon d'Infanterie Territoriale 7), and the Wagner Group has established "a solid influence" on the CAR military's general staff and other government institutions. As of late December, the rebels switched from frontline fighting to "guerrilla" warfare, reportedly causing "a large number of wounded" among the Russian PMCs, according to an expert at France's Center for International Studies.

In December 2021, the Wagner Group was reported to be arresting civilians in Bria, and forcing them to do work for the contractors. On 4 January 2022, Wagner Group members reportedly killed four civilians in the town. As they left, they took the bodies with them. The following day, the contractors were also accused of killing 17 people in a village near the Cameroon border. Mid-January, between 30 and 70 civilians were reportedly killed, some by stray fire, during an operation by the CAR military and the Wagner Group near Bria against the UPC rebels. Subsequently, the UN launched an investigation into the killings.

In mid-February 2022, a Wagner-led government offensive was launched in the northeast of the country, that involved 400 Wagner contractors and 200 former rebels. On 12 February, Wagner PMCs and government troops advanced into Ouadda, killing Damane Zakaria, leader of the Patriotic Rally for the Renewal of the Central African Republic (RPRC) armed group, and 20 of his men. Five days later, at least 100 Wagner fighters also arrived in Sam Ouandja. In early March, the Wagner Group recaptured the town of Nzacko, during fighting that left five rebels and two PMCs dead. Several days later, Wagner members also clashed with rebels in a village near Ndélé, pushing the rebels out. Mid-March, fighting between Wagner and the rebels in a town northwest of Tiringoulou left around 20 people dead.

Mid-April 2022, Wagner Group PMCs were accused of killing 20 civilians in two towns between Ndélé and Tiringoulou. In late May, Wagner forces established their presence in a number of towns in Vakaga province, including Tiringoulou.

On 3 May 2022, the Human Rights Watch (HRW) group called upon the Special Criminal Court (SCC) and International Criminal Court (ICC) for the prosecution of the Wagner Group. The HRW investigation, which included interviewing 40 people, including 10 victims and 15 witnesses, between 2019 and 2021, blamed Wagner contractors for the killing of 13 civilians near Bossangoa in 2021. Four days later, The Daily Beast cited CAR officials who alleged attacks and rapes by Wagner contractors at a Henri Izamo military camp hospital in Bangui on 10 April 2022. In late June, it was reported that since the start of the year Wagner PMCs conducted nine raids, including helicopter assaults, on mines in the lawless border areas between the CAR and Sudan, with three major attacks taking place on 13 March, 15 April and 24 May. During the assaults, the PMCs reportedly took everything they could before leaving. The attacks left dozens of miners and a number of rebels dead. In September 2022, The Daily Beast interviewed survivors and witnesses of yet another massacre committed by the Wagner Group in Bèzèrè village in December 2021, which involved torture, killing and disembowelment of a number of women, including pregnant ones.

In mid-January 2023, the Wagner Group sustained relatively heavy casualties as a new government military offensive was launched near the CAR border with Cameroon and Chad. Fighting also erupted near the border with Sudan. The rebels claimed between seven and 17 Wagner PMCs were among the dozens of casualties. A CAR military source also confirmed seven Wagner contractors were killed in one ambush.

Corporate activities 
According to a 2022 joint investigation and report from European Investigative Collaborations (EIC), the French organization All Eyes on Wagner, and the UK-based Dossier Center, Wagner Group has been controlling Diamville diamond trading company in Central African Republic since 2019.

Sources

References 

Wagner Group
Mercenary warfare